Armand de Camboust, duc de Coislin (1 September 1635, Paris – 16 September 1702) was a French lieutenant général des armées du roi, and a duke and peer of France. The son of a colonel in the Swiss Guards, he was elected a member of the Académie Française in 1652 aged 16 and a half. After his death his seat was then held by his two sons, Pierre and Henri-Charles.

External links
Biography at Académie française site

1635 births
1702 deaths
Members of the Académie Française
Armand
 1
17th-century peers of France
18th-century peers of France
Peers created by Louis XIV